Upali Tissa Vitharana (born 30 August 1934) is a Sri Lankan politician, former Member of Parliament and former cabinet minister. He is the current leader of the Lanka Sama Samaja Party (LSSP), a member of the United People's Freedom Alliance (UPFA), and is serving as Governor of North Central Province.

Early life and family
Vitharana was born 30 August 1934 in Nuwara Eliya in central Ceylon. He was the son of Pieris Vitharana, a Public Works Department engineer, and N. P. Maggie Perera, sister of N. M. Perera. He was educated at Trinity College, Kandy and Ananda College, Colombo. He played cricket for both schools. After school he joined the University of Ceylon's medical faculty in Colombo, graduating in 1959 with a MBBS degree. Vitharana captained the university's cricket team in 1957/58 and took part in the Sara Trophy Tournament.

Career
After university Vitharana worked as a medical officer (1959–67) and was registrar at Colombo General Hospital in 1963/64. His post graduate work earned him an MD degree in clinical medicine from the University of Ceylon in 1965. He then went to study in the UK, obtaining a Diploma in Bacteriology from the London School of Hygiene & Tropical Medicine in 1968 and a Ph.D. in virology from the University of London in 1971. Specialising in bacteriology and virology, Vitharana joined the Medical Research Institute (MRI) in Colombo in 1972, serving as its director from 1983 to 1994. He was head of the virology department at the MRI from 1972 to 1994. Vitharana was a consultant virologist at the Edinburgh City Hospital's Regional Virus Laboratory in the 1980s. He was deputy director of the Victoria Infectious Diseases Reference Laboratory in Melbourne from 1991 to 1993.

Politics & Lanka Sama Samaja Party 
Following retirement in 1994 Vitharana was a professor of microbiology at the University of Sri Jayewardenepura from 1995 to 2000 and an advisor to the Minister of Science and Technology from 1994 to 2001.

Vitharana joined the Lanka Sama Samaja Party (LSSP) in 1974. On 20 January 2004 the Sri Lanka Freedom Party (SLFP) and the Janatha Vimukthi Peramuna (JVP) formed the United People's Freedom Alliance (UPFA). The Communist Party of Sri Lanka CPSL and LSSP joined the UPFA in February 2004. Vitharana was appointed as a UPFA National List MP in the Sri Lankan Parliament following the 2004 parliamentary election. He was appointed Minister of Science and Technology after the election.

Vitharana was re-appointed as a UPFA National List MP following the 2010 parliamentary election. He lost his cabinet position after the election but shortly afterwards, in May 2010, he was appointed Minister of Technology and Research. He was promoted to Senior Minister of Scientific Affairs in November 2010. He lost his cabinet position following the 2015 presidential election.

At the 2015 parliamentary election Vitharana was placed on the UPFA's list of National List candidates. However, after the election he was not appointed to the National List.

Governorship. 
On December 4, 2019, Vitharana was appointed as Governor for  the North Central Province, Sri Lanka. He was sworn in before President Gotabaya Rajapaksa.

Awards 
Vitharana was awarded the Vidya Jyothi title in the 2017 Sri Lankan national honours.

Personal life 
Vitharana is married to Kamini Meedeniya. They have a son, Ranil.

References

1934 births
Academic staff of the University of Sri Jayewardenepura
Alumni of Ananda College
Alumni of Trinity College, Kandy
Alumni of the London School of Hygiene & Tropical Medicine
Alumni of the University of Ceylon (Colombo)
Alumni of the University of London
Cabinet ministers of Sri Lanka
Lanka Sama Samaja Party politicians
Living people
Members of the 13th Parliament of Sri Lanka
Members of the 14th Parliament of Sri Lanka
Members of the 16th Parliament of Sri Lanka
People from British Ceylon
Sinhalese academics
Sinhalese politicians
Sinhalese physicians
Sri Lankan Buddhists
United People's Freedom Alliance politicians
Vidya Jyothi